Werner Pfirter (19 December 1946 – 24 September 1973) was a Swiss professional Grand Prix motorcycle road racer. 

Born in Pratteln, his most successful year was in 1971 when he finished in sixth place in the 350cc world championship. Pfirter was killed in a road accident near Lleida, Spain in 1973 while driving home from the Spanish Grand Prix.

Grand Prix motorcycle racing results Werner Pfirter Isle of Man TT statistics at iomtt.com

(key) (Races in bold indicate pole position; races in italics indicate fastest lap)

References 

1946 births
1973 deaths
Sportspeople from Basel-Landschaft
Swiss motorcycle racers
250cc World Championship riders
350cc World Championship riders
Isle of Man TT riders
Road incident deaths in Spain